Number Two Express is the second studio album by the American jazz bassist Christian McBride. It was recorded in 1995 and released by Verve Records the following year. The album peaked at #23 in the Billboard Jazz Albums chart.

Reception
Scott Yanow of AllMusic commented: "Continually interesting music which contains plenty of variety". Bill Kohlhaase, of the Los Angeles Times, wrote: "Bass sensation Christian McBride has followed his well-received debut album, 'Gettin' to It,' with a surprisingly modern album that shows him moving ahead in taste and ambition. While the first album focused on soulful sounds and its leader's gutbucket pluck, the new disc plunges hard ahead with smarts, sizzle and fine interplay between celebrity players including pianists Chick Corea and Kenny Barron, saxophonists Gary Bartz and Kenny Garrett, vibist Steve Nelson and drummer Jack DeJohnette (playing with Corea for the first time since their Miles Davis days). Not only has McBride's material become more sophisticated, his improvisations have also progressed a notch. They're not so reliant on riffs and repetition."

Track listing

Personnel

Musicians
Christian McBride – Upright and Electric bass
Kenny Barron – Piano
Gary Bartz – Alto saxophone
Mino Cinelu – Percussion
Chick Corea – Piano
Jack DeJohnette – Drums
Kenny Garrett – Alto saxophone
Steve Nelson – Vibes

Production
Richard Seidel & Don Sickler – Production
Jim Anderson – Recording

Chart performance

References

External links 
 Christian McBride Discography
 

Christian McBride albums
1996 albums